NZ Local Government Magazine  is a monthly title published by Contrafed Publishing, an Auckland-based company. It was first published in 1964. Contrafed Publishing, which also publishes Contractor, Energy NZ, Quarrying and Mining, purchased the publication from Mediaweb in 2014.

Content
The magazine "provides independent news and feature coverage of the entire local government sector", and it covers topics including "governance, finance and rates, engineering, coastal management, conferences, training and recruitment." According to its website "each issue includes a digest of news reports and personnel changes throughout the country, expert opinions on legislation and legal decisions affecting the sector, as well as feature articles covering the issues of the moment."

References

External links 
 New Zealand Local Government
 Contrafed Publishing

1964 establishments in New Zealand
Local government in New Zealand
Magazines established in 1964
Mass media in Auckland
Monthly magazines published in New Zealand
Magazines published in New Zealand
Professional and trade magazines